Reidar Åsgård (born 4 May 1943) is a Norwegian politician for the Labour Party.

Following the 2007 elections Åsgård is the mayor of the Norwegian municipality of Engerdal in Hedmark. Åsgård has held this office several times earlier, most recently from 1999 to 2003.

From 2003 to 2007 he held the highest political office of the internal politics of Hedmark county as he was the leader of the executive branch (fylkesrådsleder) of Hedmark county council.

References

1943 births
Living people
People from Engerdal
Labour Party (Norway) politicians
Mayors of places in Hedmark